Arthur W. Robinson (born 1880 – year of death unknown) was an English first-class cricketer who played seven games with little success, he also played rugby league for Hull Kingston Rovers as a .

Robinson's debut was in South Africa in January 1906, when he appeared for Natal against Marylebone Cricket Club (MCC) at Pietermaritzburg, scoring 4 and 0. He did not appear in first-class cricket again until after the First World War, playing for Worcestershire against Hampshire in May 1920. He fared little better than he had 14 years earlier, making 2* and 4.

Another sizeable gap followed before Robinson, by now in his mid-forties, played five more times for Worcestershire in 1925 and 1926. Once again, however, he failed to make the most of his opportunity and his highest score was 37 against Yorkshire in the first of these games in July 1925.

Challenge Cup Final appearances
Arthur W. Robinson played right-, i.e. number 3, in Hull Kingston Rovers' 0–6 defeat by Warrington in the 1905 Challenge Cup Final during the 1904–05 season at Headingley Rugby Stadium, Leeds on Saturday 29 April 1905, in front of a crowd of 19,638.

References

External links
 

1880 births
Cricketers from Yorkshire
English cricketers
English rugby league players
Hull Kingston Rovers players
KwaZulu-Natal cricketers
Rugby league centres
Rugby league players from Yorkshire
Worcestershire cricketers
Year of death missing